Pablo Andres Ortiz Gonzalez (born 7 January 1998) is a Colombian footballer who plays for Honduran side Real de Minas.

Career statistics

Club

Notes

References

External links
 Profile at Saginaw Valley State University

Living people
1998 births
Colombian footballers
Colombian expatriate footballers
Association football midfielders
Saginaw Valley State University alumni
FC Golden State Force players
C.D. Real de Minas players
USL League Two players
Liga Nacional de Fútbol Profesional de Honduras players
Colombian expatriate sportspeople in the United States
Expatriate soccer players in the United States
Colombian expatriate sportspeople in Honduras
Expatriate footballers in Honduras
Footballers from Cali